Hystricella is a genus of air-breathing land snails, terrestrial pulmonate gastropod mollusks in the subfamily Geomitrinae of the family Geomitridae, the hairy snails and their allies.

Species
Species within the genus Hystricella include:
 † Hystricella aucta (Wollaston, 1878) 
 Hystricella bicarinata (G. B. Sowerby I, 1824)
 † Hystricella echinoderma (Wollaston, 1878) 
 Hystricella echinulata (R. T. Lowe, 1831)
 † Hystricella microcarinata De Mattia & Groh, 2018 

Synonyms
 Hystricella leacockiana (Wollaston, 1878): synonym of Wollastonaria leacockiana (Wollaston, 1878) (superseded generic combination)
 Hystricella oxytropis (R. T. Lowe, 1831) :synonym of Wollastonaria oxytropis (R. T. Lowe, 1831) (superseded generic combination)
 Hystricella turricula (R. T. Lowe, 1831): synonym of Wollastonaria turricula (R. T. Lowe, 1831) (superseded generic combination)

References

 Bank, R. A. (2017). Classification of the Recent terrestrial Gastropoda of the World. Last update: July 16th, 2017

External links
 Lowe, R. T. (1855 ("1854")). Catalogus molluscorum pneumonatorum insularum Maderensium: or a list of all the land and freshwater shells, recent and fossil, of the Madeiran islands: arranged in groups according to their natural affinities; with diagnoses of the groups, and of the new or hitherto imperfectly defined species. Proceedings of the Zoological Society of London. 22: 161-208
 De Mattia, W., Neiber, M. T. & Groh, K. (2018). Revision of the genus-group Hystricella R. T. Lowe, 1855 from Porto Santo (Madeira Archipelago), with descriptions of new recent and fossil taxa (Gastropoda, Helicoidea, Geomitridae). ZooKeys. 732: 1-125

Geomitridae